Balarampur  is a Village Development Committee in Rupandehi District in Lumbini Province of southern Nepal. At the time of the 1991 Nepal census it had a population of 4533 people residing in 686 individual households.

References

Populated places in Rupandehi District